Pouteria virescens is a species of plant in the family Sapotaceae. It is found in Brazil, French Guiana, and Guyana.

References

virescens
Least concern plants
Taxonomy articles created by Polbot
Taxa named by Charles Baehni